Ganotown is an unincorporated community on Back Creek in Berkeley County, West Virginia, United States. It is located at the crossroads of County Routes 7 and 7/19.

The community was named after the local Gano family.

References

Unincorporated communities in Berkeley County, West Virginia
Unincorporated communities in West Virginia